Rob Jan Rooken (born 5 October 1969) is a Dutch politician who has served as a Member of the European Parliament (MEP) since 2 July 2019. 

Rooken worked as a web designer before entering politics. He was also the founder of the IT company XOIP which was sold to Tiscali in 2001 before Rooken bought it back. He is a member of the JA21 political party, which he joined after leaving the Forum for Democracy (FvD) in 2020. In the 2019 European Parliament election, Rooken was placed third on the list led by Derk Jan Eppink. In the 2019 Senate election, he was placed seventh on the list led by Henk Otten.

References

External links
  Parlement.com - biography

Living people
1969 births
People from Gooise Meren
MEPs for the Netherlands 2019–2024
Forum for Democracy MEPs
JA21 politicians